Glesno  is a village in the administrative district of Gmina Wyrzysk, within Piła County, Greater Poland Voivodeship, in west-central Poland.

The village has an approximate population of 600.

References

Glesno